Francesco Melanzio (1460–1526) was an Italian painter of the Renaissance period in Montefalco, Umbria.

He was born in Montefalco, and said to have been, along with Bernardino di Mariotto, a pupil of Fiorenzo di Lorenzo. He painted extensive frescoes in the Monastery of San Francesco in Montefalco.

References

1460 births
1526 deaths
Umbrian painters
15th-century Italian painters
Italian male painters
16th-century Italian painters
Italian Renaissance painters